A special, reversal form of drug delivery where modulation of active migratory behaviour of the target cells is used to achieve targeted effects. The general components of the conjugates are designed as follows: (i) carrier – regularly possessing promoter effect also on internalization into the cell; (ii) chemotactically active ligands acting on the target cells; (iii) drug to be delivered in a selective way and (iv) spacer sequence which joins drug molecule to the carrier and due to it enzyme labile moiety makes possible the intracellular compartment specific release of the drug.

Careful selection of chemotactic component of the ligand not only the chemoattractant character could be expended, however, chemorepellent ligands are also valuable as they are useful to keep away cell populations degrading the conjugate containing the drug.

This mechanism of drug delivery is currently being studied.

References

External links
 Chemotaxis

Cell biology
Pharmacokinetics
Physiology
Signal transduction
Taxes (biology)